J.J Mall is a large shopping complex in the heart of the Chatuchak district in Bangkok, Thailand.
It is located next to the weekend market. (J.J Market).
The whole area has become a single vast building site and all shop zones are interlinked.
They use the slogan: Everything For You
The mall is a 7-storey building comprising 4 stories of shopping zones and 3 floors of parking, for more than 2,000 vehicles including open-air parking for buses.

See also
 List of shopping malls in Thailand

References

External links
official website

Shopping malls in Bangkok
Chatuchak district